Hattian Bala is a town in Hattian Bala District of Azad Kashmir, Pakistan. It is the headquarters of district and tehsil Hattian Bala.

See also
Awan Patti
Muzaffarabad
Garhi Dupatta
Chakar

References

Jhelum Valley District
Tehsils of Jhelum Valley District